The 2009 African Nations Championship, also known as CHAN 2009 for short, was the inaugural edition of the biennial association football tournament organized by CAF featuring national teams consisting of players playing in their respective local leagues. It was held in Ivory Coast from 22 February to 8 March 2009.

Qualification

Thirty countries attempted to qualify for the tournament, with a total of 8 teams qualifying for this inaugural edition, including hosts Ivory Coast.

Squads

Each squad consisted of a total of 28 players.

Qualified teams

Draw
The draw for the group stage was held in Abidjan on Friday 26 December 2008.

Venues

Group stage

Tie-breaking criteria 
Where two or more teams end the group stage with the same number of points, their ranking is determined by the following criteria:
 points earned in the matches between the teams concerned;
 goal difference in the matches between the teams concerned;
 number of goals scored in the group matches between the teams concerned;
 number of away goals scored in the matches between the teams concerned;
 goal difference in all group matches;
 number of goals scored in all group matches;
 Yellow and red cards
 drawing of lots by the organizing committee.

All times given as local time (UTC+00:00)

Group A

Group B 

NB: Ghana coach Milovan Rajevac was sent to the stands in the 82nd minute for unsporting behaviour.

Knockout phase

Semi-finals

Third-place play-off

Final

References

External links 
 2009 CHAN Homepage
 Fixtures and Results of CHAN qualifications on CAFOnline.com

2009 African Nations Championship
2009 in African football
International association football competitions hosted by Ivory Coast
2009 in Ivorian football
African Nations Championship
February 2009 sports events in Africa
March 2009 sports events in Africa